Southampton City Council is the local authority of the city of Southampton. It is a unitary authority, having the powers of a non-metropolitan county and district council combined. It provides a full range of local government services including council tax billing, libraries, social services, processing planning applications, waste collection and disposal, and it is a local education authority. The council uses a leader and cabinet structure. Labour has been in control of the council since 2022.

History

Southampton City Council has records in its archives of council meetings as early as 1199. The Local Government Act 1888 established Southampton as a county borough of the county Hampshire, then officially known as the County of Southampton. This meant that the city of Southampton had independent governance from the county.

Local government restructuring with an act in 1973 made the City of Southampton a non-metropolitan district within the Hampshire county. It succeeded Hampshire County Council and became a Unitary Authority in April 1997 due to the 1992 Local Government Act.

From 2000 to 2008 the council was under no overall control of any one party. Though the Liberal Democrats supported a minority Conservative administration after the 2007 election, in February 2008 the Lib Dems aligned with the Labour party to set a new budget. The subsequent May 2008 election that year saw the Conservatives achieved a majority control of the council.

Since the 2012 council election the Labour party re-took control of the city council, Mark Williams was council leader for a few months and resigned for behaviours that, according to an independent enquiry, "fell below national guidelines of openness and honesty in public life" after attempting to cover up the split of Coxford councillors Don Thomas and Keith Morrell from the Labour party. He was replaced as council leader by Simon Letts in 2013. There have been two splits from the party whilst in a majority administration due to the implementation of austerity measures from central government: the two aforementioned Coxford councillors in 2013 who originally called themselves the 'Labour Councillors Against the Cuts' group, and later known as 'Putting People First'; and Redbridge councillor Andrew Pope in 2015, who formed the Southampton Independents. In the 2018 election both Simon Letts, and Jeremy Moulton, the leader of the Conservative group, lost their seats. Chris Hammond became the new leader of the council after the election. In 2018 two municipal companies were set up by the council, 'CItizEN' and the 'Southampton Local Authority Trading Company'.

Powers and functions
The local authority derives its powers and functions from the Local Government Act 1972 and subsequent legislation. For the purposes of local government, Southampton is within a non-metropolitan area of England. As a unitary authority, Southampton City Council has the powers and functions of both a non-metropolitan county and district council combined. In its capacity as a district council it is a billing authority collecting Council Tax and business rates, it processes local planning applications, it is responsible for housing, waste collection and environmental health. In its capacity as a county council it is a local education authority, responsible for social services, libraries and waste disposal.

In August 2018 the council launched its own not-for-profit energy company 'CitizEn', created with the ambition to offer competitive rates for energy to tackle fuel poverty in the city. The company was set up in cooperation with Nottingham City Council’s company Robin Hood Energy. The council is currently in talks with Bournemouth, Christchurch and Poole Council for them to become a partner in the scheme.

Local Authority Trading Company
In response to the 2008 financial crash and the Great Recession the then city council, under the administration of the Conservative Party, began a process of privatisation of council services. From 2017 the Labour administration had begun a process taking municipal control of services that were privatised, so that all profits are reinvested into council services. These services were set up and the Southampton "Local Authority Trading Company" (LATCo) was created. Potential areas for the LATCo to cover include: street parking; public transport; adult and children’s transport; fleet services; housing management and operations; street cleansing; waste management; parks and open spaces; and facilities management.

In 2018 the council began the process of incorporating services which Capita had provided for the council for 11 years, including "customer services, HR pay, revenues and benefits, procurement, health and safety, print, post room and IT services". This also includes the incorporation of 300 jobs under the Council's LATCo.

Joint Committees
Southampton had sent a representative to the South East England Regional Assembly during its existence between 1998 and 2010. Created by the Regional Development Agencies Act 1998 and based in Guildford, the voluntary assembly met six times a year and was responsible for the South East England Development Agency, a project which oversaw investment projects in the south east region. The council remains a member of the South East England Councils.

Solent Local Enterprise Partnership (LEP) is chaired by several businesses, universities and councils including Southampton City Council and primarily focuses on economic growth in the Hampshire region. The Solent LEP's Growth Hub is based in Southampton. There was an ambition to create a combined authority for the South Hampshire area, including Southampton, Portsmouth and the Isle of Wight which would include the potential for a combined authority mayor. This program was controversial, and was finally blocked by Hampshire County Council in 2017. There continues to be interest in partnership between Southampton City Council, Eastleigh Borough Council and neighbouring components of other Hampshire districts (New Forest District Council and Test Valley Borough Council).

Southampton City Council is also a founding member of the 'Key Cities' group. It is a lobbying group of 24 other cities across Great Britain, formed in 2013, that lobbies the government for greater devolution and funding

Political composition

There are 48 seats on the council, 3 seats for each of the city's 16 wards. The wards are:

 Bargate
 Bassett
 Bevois
 Bitterne
 Bitterne Park
 Coxford
 Freemantle
 Harefield
 Millbrook
 Peartree
 Portswood
 Redbridge
 Shirley
 Sholing
 Swaythling
 Woolston

For each election, a third of the council or one representative for each ward is elected for a term of four years. Over four years there are three elections and a fourth gap year. Since becoming a unitary authority in 1997 the party has been controlled by different parties:

National referendums in Southampton

2011 Alternative Vote referendum

On Thursday 5 May 2011 Southampton voted in the 2011 Alternative Vote referendum under the provisions of the Parliamentary Voting System and Constituencies Act 2011 where voters were asked to decide on the question "At present, the UK uses the 'first past the post' system to elect MPs to the House of Commons. Should the 'alternative vote' system be used instead?" by voting for either "Yes" or "No".

2016 EU membership referendum

On Thursday 23 June 2016 Southampton voted in the 2016 EU Referendum under the provisions of the European Union Referendum Act 2015 where voters were asked to decide on the question "Should the United Kingdom remain a member of the European Union or leave the European Union?" by voting for either "Remain a member of the European Union" or "Leave the European Union". The result produced a "Leave" majority on a turnout of 68% across the city, lower than the national average of 72%. The Labour MP for Southampton Test Alan Whitehead supported "remain", whilst Royston Smith the MP for Southampton Itchen supported "leave".

References

Footnotes

External links 
 

Unitary authority councils of England
Local education authorities in England
Local authorities in Hampshire
Leader and cabinet executives
Billing authorities in England
City Council